Joseph Clark (October 12, 1787 Westerly, Washington County, Rhode Island — May 11, 1873) was an American politician from New York.

Life
He was the son of Capt. Samuel Clark (1754–1830) and Chloe (Maxson) Clark (d. 1833). In 1801, the family removed to Brookfield, New York. He was a blacksmith and ran a foundry which he sold after his election to the State Senate. He was at times Postmaster, Town Clerk, Justice of the Peace, Town Supervisor, and an associate judge of the Madison County Court. On September 16, 1807, he married Esther Lamphere (1791–1862), and they had several children.

He was a member of the New York State Assembly (Madison Co.) in 1824, 1828 and 1835.

He was a member of the New York State Senate (5th D.) from 1839 to 1842, sitting in the 62nd, 63rd, 64th and 65th New York State Legislatures.

References

Footnotes

Sources

The New York Civil List compiled by Franklin Benjamin Hough (pages 132f, 139, 201, 206, 216 and 265; Weed, Parsons and Co., 1858)

External links

1787 births
1873 deaths
Democratic Party New York (state) state senators
People from Brookfield, New York
Democratic Party members of the New York State Assembly
New York (state) state court judges
Town supervisors in New York (state)
People from Westerly, Rhode Island
19th-century American politicians
19th-century American judges